Hendrikus Franciscus Groener, commonly known as Henk Groener (born 29 September 1960) is a Dutch handball coach, and former handball player. He is the current head coach of Borussia Dortmund Handball, since November 2022.

Career
He played 208 games with the Dutch national team, scoring 519 goals.

From 2002 to 2006 he coached the Dutch national men's team, and since 2009 he has coached the Dutch women's team. With this team he qualified for the 2011, 2013 and 2015 World Women's Handball Championships. The Dutch team also qualified for the 2016 Olympic Games where they finished 4th. After this tournament, Groener left the team.

On 1 January 2018 he took over the German women's national team.

References

1960 births
Living people
Dutch handball coaches
Dutch male handball players
People from Leersum
Dutch expatriate sportspeople in Germany
Handball coaches of international teams
Sportspeople from Utrecht (province)